Chat Room is a 2012 American educational television series. Produced by Steve Rotfeld Productions (SRP), it consisted consisting of a panel young people that discusses teen-oriented issues, with panelists giving their opinions, and advising kids on how to deal with potential problems. The series was broadcast in syndication.

References

External links

 
 

2012 American television series debuts
American educational television series